Laryngotracheal stenosis refers to abnormal narrowing of the central air passageways.  This can occur at the level of the  larynx, trachea, carina or main bronchi.
In a small number of patients narrowing may be present in more than one anatomical location.

Presentation
The most common symptom of laryngotracheal stenosis is gradually-worsening breathlessness (dyspnea) particularly when undertaking physical activities (exertional dyspnea).  The patient may also experience added respiratory sounds which in the more severe cases can be identified as stridor but in many cases can be readily mistaken for wheeze.   This creates a diagnostic pitfall in which many patients with laryngotracheal stenosis are incorrectly diagnosed as having asthma and are treated for presumed lower airway disease.  This increases the likelihood of the patient eventually requiring major open surgery in benign disease and can lead to tracheal cancer presenting too late for curative surgery to be performed.

Causes
Laryngotracheal stenosis is an umbrella term for a wide and heterogeneous group of very rare conditions.  The population incidence of adult post-intubation laryngotracheal stenosis which is the commonest benign sub-type of this condition is approximately 1 in 200,000 adults per year. The main causes of adult laryngotracheal stenosis are:

Diagnosis
Patient history, CT scan of neck and chest, fiberoptic bronchoscopy, and spirometry are all several ways to assess for laryngotracheal stenosis and effectively develop preoperational approaches to treating the disease. In addition, a methodology called the Cotton-Myer system is commonly used to evaluate the degree of severity of the laryngotracheal stenosis based on the percentage of obstruction; other systems have also been proposed to fill potential shortcomings of the Cotton-Myer classification and help capture the full complexity of the illness.

Treatment
The optimal management of laryngotracheal stenosis is not well defined, depending  mainly on the type of the stenosis.
General treatment options include 
 Tracheal dilation using rigid bronchoscope
 Laser surgery and endoluminal stenting
 Tracheal resection and laryngotracheal reconstruction

Tracheal dilation is used to temporarily enlarge the airway. The effect of dilation typically lasts from a few days to 6 months. Several studies have shown that as a result of mechanical dilation (used alone) may occur a high mortality rate and a rate of recurrence of stenosis higher than 90%.
Thus, many authors treat the stenosis by endoscopic excision with laser (commonly either the carbon dioxide or the neodymium: yttrium aluminum garnet laser) and then by using bronchoscopic dilatation and prolonged stenting with a T-tube (generally in silicone).

There are differing opinions on treating with laser surgery.

In very experienced surgery centers, tracheal resection and reconstruction (anastomosis complete end-to-end with or without laryngotracheal temporary stent to prevent airway collapse) is currently the best alternative to completely cure the stenosis and allows to obtain good results. Therefore, it can be considered the gold standard treatment and is suitable for almost all patients.

The narrowed part of the trachea will be cut off and the cut ends of the trachea sewn together with sutures. For stenosis of length greater than 5 cm a stent may be required to join the sections.

Late June or early July 2010, a new potential treatment was trialed at Great Ormond Street Hospital in London, where Ciaran Finn-Lynch (aged 11) received a transplanted trachea which had been injected with stem cells harvested from his own bone marrow.  The use of Ciaran's stem cells was hoped to prevent his immune system from rejecting the transplant, but there remain doubts about the operation's success, and several later attempts at similar surgery have been unsuccessful.

Nomenclature
Laryngotracheal stenosis (Laryngo-: Glottic Stenosis; Subglottic Stenosis; Tracheal: narrowings at different levels of the windpipe) is a more accurate description for this condition when compared, for example to subglottic stenosis which technically only refers to narrowing just below vocal folds or tracheal stenosis.  In babies and young children however, the subglottis is the narrowest part of the airway and most stenoses do in fact occur at this level. Subglottic stenosis is often therefore used to describe central airway narrowing in children, and laryngotracheal stenosis is more often used in adults.

See also
 Hermes Grillo pioneer in tracheal resection surgery
 Laryngospasm

References

Bibliography

External links 

Respiratory diseases
Gross pathology